This is a list of events from British radio in 1945.

Events

January
No events.

February
No events.

March
No events.

April
 15 April – BBC correspondent Richard Dimbleby accompanies the British 11th Armoured Division to the liberation of Bergen-Belsen concentration camp, making one of the first reports from there. His description of what he sees ("the world of a nightmare") is so graphic, the BBC declines to broadcast his dispatch for 4 days, relenting only when he threatens to resign.

May
 1 May – Reichssender Hamburg's Flensburg substation, the last shortwave radio station remaining on the air in Germany, announces the death of Adolf Hitler. The first place in the UK to hear of this is the BBC Monitoring Service at Caversham Park near Reading, Berkshire.
 4 May – Radio Hamburg begins broadcasting from the British occupied zone of Germany, with Wynford Vaughan-Thomas speaking from "Lord Haw-Haw"'s studio for the BBC. On 22 September, the station becomes Nordwestdeutscher Rundfunk (NWDR), the zone's official broadcasting organisation, set up by Hugh Greene.
 7 May – The last German communication to be decoded at Bletchley Park is from a military radio station at Cuxhaven closing down. This evening the BBC in the UK announces that the following day will be a holiday, Victory in Europe Day.
 8 May – Victory in Europe Day in Western Europe. At 15:00 BST in the UK, the Prime Minister, Winston Churchill, makes a speech to the nation on the BBC from 10 Downing Street, and at 21:00 King George VI speaks to the British Empire from Buckingham Palace. Wynford Vaughan-Thomas reports from Lüneburg and Frank Gillard from Kassel.
 28 May – U.S.-born Irish-raised William Joyce ("Lord Haw-Haw") is captured by British forces on the German border two days after recording his final (rambling and audibly drunk) English-language propaganda broadcast for Nazi German radio. He later stands trial in London for high treason for his earlier wartime broadcasts, is convicted, and hanged in January 1946.

June
 4 June – Prime Minister Winston Churchill, in a broadcast speech during the 1945 United Kingdom general election campaign, claims that a future socialist government "would have to fall back on some form of Gestapo". His eventually successful opponent Clement Attlee responds the next night by ironically thanking the prime minister for demonstrating to people the difference between Churchill the great wartime leader and Churchill the peacetime politician.

July
 29 July – The BBC Light Programme radio station is launched, concentrating on the broadcasting of mainstream light music and entertainment, superseding the BBC General Forces Programme within the UK using its longwave frequency from the Droitwich Transmitting Station.

August
 1 August – Family Favourites is the successor to the wartime radio show Forces Favourites,  broadcast at Sunday lunchtimes on the Light Programme in the UK and the British Forces Broadcasting Service in Europe; it runs until 1980.
 14 August – Late this evening, the new Prime Minister, Clement Attlee, and his Foreign Secretary, Ernest Bevin, broadcast news of the surrender of Japan to the nation and Empire, speaking from 10 Downing Street.

September to December
No events.

Unknown
 The BBC issues the first Welsh edition of Radio Times.
 Welsh BBC correspondence Wynford Vaughan-Thomas is awarded the Croix de guerre 1939–1945 for his war reports from France.

Station debuts
 29 July – BBC Light Programme (1945–1967)

Debuts
 1 August – Family Favourites (1945–1980)
 9 October – Today in Parliament (1945–Present)

Continuing radio programmes

1930s
 In Town Tonight (1933–1960)

1940s
 Music While You Work (1940–1967)
 Sunday Half Hour (1940–2018)
 Desert Island Discs (1942–Present)

Births
 9 January – Bill Heine, American-born radio presenter and cinema owner (died 2019)
 30 March – Johnnie Walker, born Peter Dingley, DJ
 25 May – Dave Lee Travis, born David Griffin, DJ
 22 August – Pete Atkin, singer-songwriter and radio producer
 23 August – Peter Donaldson, Egyptian-born newsreader (died 2015)
 15 September – Clive Merrison, Welsh-born actor (Sherlock Holmes)
 28 October – Simon Brett, radio producer and scriptwriter and detective fiction writer
 Ernie Rea, Northern Irish religious broadcaster

Deaths
 3 February – Guy Byam, war reporter (shot down while flying on an air raid)
 18 September – C. H. Middleton, gardening broadcaster (born 1886)

See also 
 1945 in British music
 1945 in British television
 1945 in the United Kingdom
 List of British films of 1945

References 

 
Years in British radio
Radio